Karla Cuevas is Honduras's Minister of Human Rights, Justice, Governance and Decentralization.

References

Living people
Government ministers of Honduras
Year of birth missing (living people)
Female justice ministers
Women government ministers of Honduras
21st-century Honduran women politicians
21st-century Honduran politicians